There have been three distinct types of British Rail locomotive that are referred to as Class 41.

British Rail Class 41 (Warship Class), 1957-58 prototypes
British Rail Class 41 (HST), 1972 prototype High Speed Train power cars
List of British Rail unbuilt locomotive classes#Type 4 locomotives, an unbuilt class proposed in the 1990s

41 0